Argentina competed at the 2022 World Aquatics Championships in Budapest, Hungary from 18 June to 3 July.

Artistic swimming 

Women

Open water swimming

Swimming

Water polo 

Summary

Women's tournament

Team roster

Group play

Playoffs

9th-12th place semifinal

Eleventh place game

References

Nations at the 2022 World Aquatics Championships
Argentina at the World Aquatics Championships
World Aquatics Championships